Luca Vecchi (born 21 September 1972 in Reggio Emilia) is an Italian politician.

He is a member of the Democratic Party and he was elected Mayor of Reggio Emilia on 25 May 2014 and took office on 5 June. He has been re-elected for a second term in 2019.

See also
2014 Italian local elections
2019 Italian local elections
List of mayors of Reggio Emilia

References

External links
 
 

1972 births
Living people
Mayors of Reggio Emilia
Democratic Party (Italy) politicians